The term Mothmen can mean:

 The Mothmen, an English post-punk band.
 Mothman, a  supernatural being numerously sighted in the 1960s.